Lunns Store is an unincorporated community in Marshall County, in the U.S. state of Tennessee. A variant name was "Lunn Store".

History
A post office called Lunns Store was established in 1876, and remained in operation until 1907. Beside post office, the community had a country store.

References

Unincorporated communities in Marshall County, Tennessee
Unincorporated communities in Tennessee